The Sultan's Pool is an ancient water basin to the west side of Mount Zion, Jerusalem.

The Sultan's Pool was part of the water supply network for Jerusalem from the late Second Temple period to the late Ottoman period. Today, it is an event venue for concerts and festivals.

History 

The Sultan's Pool was built by building a dam across the Valley of Hinnom, which stopped the drainage of the valley south towards the Kidron Valley and created a water reservoir. In place of the dam, an ancient bridge had previously passed, over which the lower aqueduct that carried water from Solomon's Pools near Bethlehem to Jerusalem and the Temple Mount passed.

A covered and plastered rock-hewn canal from the Roman period was discovered throughout the pool; it is likely from the time of Herod. Some scholars identify it with the Snake Pool mentioned by Josephus.

During the Crusader period, it was known as Lacus Germani.

The Pool was renovated during the early Ottoman period by Suleiman the Magnificent, who enlarged it into a reservoir measuring 67 m × 169 m × 12 m. Subsequently, the place was later renamed the Sultan's Pool. On the pool dam, Suleiman the Magnificent built a sebil for the use of pedestrians, which has been preserved to this day. Today, the Hebron Road passes over the dam.

Event Venue 
The Sultan's Pool is dry in summer and is used as a major event venue for concerts and festivals. Many international artists have performed at the site during their visit to Israel, including the Dire Straits (who played the second concert of the Brothers in Arms Tour in the Sultan Pool's, in 1985), Eurythmics, Leonard Cohen, James Taylor, Eric Clapton, Bob Dylan, Tom Petty, Jethro Tull, Madonna, Radiohead and others.

References 

Classical sites in Jerusalem
Reservoirs in Jerusalem
Festival venues
Event venues in Israel